"Iron Sky" is a rock song by Scottish singer/songwriter Paolo Nutini from his third studio album Caustic Love, which was released in April 2014. The song was released as a single on Atlantic Records in August 2014. The song was a minor hit in the UK charts in the spring of 2014, reaching number 42 in April of that year, ahead of its official single release.

The song was described as being a "slow burner." The Independent described it as being a "stirring blend of conscious-soul subject with deep-soul style" and compared the song to being, "like Percy Sledge singing Curtis Mayfield.". The song features an audio excerpt of the famous speech Charlie Chaplin gave in his film The Great Dictator (1940).

Initially a non-charting single in the Netherlands, the song was revived by radio station 3FM in early 2015 following the Paris shootings at the Charlie Hebdo offices on 7 January 2015. It was rush re-released as a single and only a week later reached number 15 in 3FM's Mega Top 50 chart.

The song is also sampled in Bon Iver's song "33 "GOD"" from their 2016 album 22, A Million.

Music video
The music video was filmed in Kyiv, Ukraine by Daniel Wolfe. It won the best music video award at the 2015 SXSW Film Festival.

Charts

Certifications

References

2014 singles
Paolo Nutini songs
Atlantic Records UK singles
2014 songs